The Good, the Bad, the Ugly is the ninth studio album by Willie Colón with backing from Yomo Toro on cuatro and vocal contributions from his regular singer Héctor Lavoe and Lavoe's replacement Rubén Blades. The album featured three cover art portraits by Ron Levine of Yomo Toro ("the Good"), Colón ("the Bad") and Lavoe ("the Ugly") but not Blades, punning the film The Good, the Bad and the Ugly. Lavoe recorded his tracks on return from Kinshasha in Zaire. It was to be Lavoe's last collaboration for a period after a successful series with Colón as he issued his first solo album La Voz.  For Blades it was his second album after 1970's De Panama a New York, also for Fania, and marked the start of a collaboration with Colón which would continue for several albums.

Track listing
Toma	(public domain) vocals Willie Colón	2:17
Potpourri III	(public domain) vocals 	Héctor Lavoe	3:20
"Cua Cua Ra, Cua Cua"	(Baden Powell)	Willie Colón	3:25
"Dona Toña"	(Willie Colón)	instrumental	3:43
MC2 - Theme for Realidades	(Willie Colón)	instrumental	3:43
El Cazangero	(Rubén Blades) vocals Rubén Blades	4:01
Guaracha	(Willie Colón)	Willie Colón	5:05
I Feel Campesino - Theme Realidades	(Willie Colón)	instrumental	3:29
Que Bien Te Ves	(Willie Colón)	Héctor Lavoe	3:35

References

1975 albums
Willie Colón albums
Héctor Lavoe albums
Rubén Blades albums
Salsa albums
Fania Records albums